Hans-Wiggo Knudsen (sometimes listed as Hans-Viggo Knudsen, August 11, 1944 – March 19, 2020) was a Danish sprint canoer who competed in the mid to late 1960s. Competing in two Summer Olympics, he earned his best finish of ninth twice (1964: K-2 1000 m, 1968: K-4 1000 m).

He was diagnosed with pulmonary fibrosis in 2018, then he died two years later from complications due to COVID-19.

References

External links

1944 births
2020 deaths
People from Næstved Municipality
Canoeists at the 1964 Summer Olympics
Canoeists at the 1968 Summer Olympics
Danish male canoeists
Olympic canoeists of Denmark
Deaths from the COVID-19 pandemic in Denmark
Sportspeople from Region Zealand